Germany debuted at the Junior Eurovision Song Contest 2020 in Warsaw, Poland. KiKa, the children's channel jointly owned by European Broadcasting Union (EBU) members ARD and ZDF, is responsible for the country's participation. Germany finished last place on their debut in 2020, when Susan Oseloff represented the country with "Stronger with You". For the 2021 competition, KiKa selected Pauline with the song "Imagine Us".

History
Germany was originally going to take part in the  contest in Copenhagen, but later withdrew from the contest. They also planned to take part in the  contest in Lillehammer but again withdrew from the contest. For 2003, the broadcaster organised a delayed broadcast on KiKa whilst the contests in 2015 and 2016 were livestreamed via the broadcaster's Eurovision Song Contest website eurovision.de with commentary provided by Thomas Mohr.

In May 2014, NDR announced they would not debut at the  contest as they believed the contest would not be a success under German television marketing standards. They did, however, observe the  contest in Kyiv, Ukraine. ZDF attended the 2014 Contest in Malta. On 1 July 2015, ARD consortium member NDR launched an online poll to decide whether Germany should participate in the  contest, which would be broadcast on their children's station, KiKa (a joint venture of ARD and ZDF). Germany ultimately did not participate.

In December 2019, KiKA confirmed that a delegation from the broadcaster and NDR was attending the  contest in Gliwice, Poland to experience the competition as part of the audience. It was emphasised that no decision had yet been made as to whether Germany would participate the following year or not although there were close discussions with the EBU.

On 8 July 2020, KiKA confirmed that a delegation from broadcasters NDR and ZDF was participating for the first time in the  contest in Warsaw. Their first ever representative, Susan Oseloff, finished in last place during the final on 29 November 2020, scoring 66 points. Nevertheless, Germany confirmed their participation in  contest in  France. On 10 September 2021, Pauline Steinmüller was announced as the artist that should represent Germany in the 2021 contest with the song "Imagine Us". In Paris, Pauline finished 17th out of 19 countries, receiving 61 points.

On 2 August 2022, KiKA and NDR confirmed they would not be participating in the 2022 edition in Yerevan, Armenia, wanting to take a "creative break", and citing partial travel warnings for Armenia issued by the Federal Foreign Office. They also confirmed that KiKA would still be broadcasting the contest, and are set to return in 2023.

Participation overview

Commentators and spokespersons
Prior to their first participation in 2020, Germany had broadcast the competition on three occasions.

See also 
Germany in the Eurovision Song Contest
Germany in the Eurovision Dance Contest
Germany in the Eurovision Young Dancers 
Germany in the Eurovision Young Musicians

References

Countries in the Junior Eurovision Song Contest
Junior